The Razakars were the paramilitary volunteer force of the Muslim nationalist Majlis-e-Ittehadul Muslimeen (MIM) party in the Hyderabad State under the British Raj. Formed in 1938 by the MIM leader Bahadur Yar Jung,
they expanded considerably during the leadership of Qasim Razvi around the time of Indian independence. They were deployed in the cause of maintaining Muslim rule in Hyderabad and resisting integration into India. Described as "enthusiastic" and "undisciplined", they targeted Hindus as well as Muslims whose loyalty was in question. They also fought communists who were launching a revolution in the state.

During the period November 1947–August 1948, when Hyderabad was under a Standstill Agreement with India, the Indian government made repeated demands to the Nizam of Hyderabad to disband the Razakars, which were all turned down. In the eventual armed invasion launched by India, dubbed a 'police action', the Razakars formed the main resistance to the Indian Army.
The Nizam surrendered and agreed to disband the Razakars. Qasim Razvi was initially jailed and then allowed to move to Pakistan where he was granted asylum.

History

The Hyderabad State was a kingdom that was ruled by the Nizam. When India became independent in 1947, like all the other Princely states, the Hyderabad State was also given the choice of either joining India or Pakistan. The Nizam wanted neither; he wanted to remain independent. The Nizam finally entered into a standstill agreement with India on 29 November 1947 to maintain the status quo.

Hyderabad state had been steadily becoming more theocratic since the beginning of the 20th century. In 1926, Mahmud Nawaz Khan, a retired Hyderabad official, founded the Majlis-e-Ittehad-ul-Muslimeen (also known as MIM).
The MIM became a powerful organization, with a principal focus of marginalizing the political aspirations of Hindus and progressive Muslims through its actions, including the insistence that Hyderabad be declared a Muslim state.

MIM "had its storm troopers in the Razakars who were headed by Kasim Razvi, a Muslim educated at Aligarh University who claimed Hyderabad was a Muslim state and that Muslim supremacy was based upon the right of conquest". The Razakars demanded special powers from the Nizam, which they started to misuse and the Nizam had to abide by their dictats. The Nizam sent a delegation to the United Nations to refer the Hyderabad State case to the UN Security Council.

The Razakar militia brutally put down the armed revolts by Communist sympathizers and the peasantry and even eliminated Muslim activists such as journalist Shoebullah Khan who advocated merger with India. The Razakars terrorised the Hindu population and its sympathizers, causing many to flee to safety into the jungles, uninhabited mud forts, or neighboring Indian provinces. The Hyderabad State Congress was banned and its leaders forced to flee to Bezawada or Bombay.

Annexation after Operation Polo

Finally, Sardar Vallabhbhai Patel, the Indian Minister for Home Affairs, decided to undertake "police action" in Hyderabad State to force the King Nizam's hand. Operation Polo was launched and the Indian Army, led by Major General J. N. Chaudhuri, entered the state from five directions. The Razakars fought briefly against the overwhelming attack by Indian forces before surrendering on 18 September 1948. Mir Laik Ali, the prime minister of the Nizam, and Qasim Rizvi were arrested.

On 22 September 1948, the Nizam withdrew his complaint from the UN Security Council. The merger of Hyderabad into the Indian Union was announced. 
Major General Chaudhuri took over as military governor of Hyderabad and stayed in that position till the end of 1949. In January 1950, M. K. Vellodi, a senior civil servant was made the Chief Minister of the state and the Nizam was given the position of "Raj Pramukh" or "Governor".

The Pandit Sunderlal Committee Report estimated that between 27,000 and 40,000 lost their lives in the violence that ensued the operation.

Disbandment
The Razakars were disbanded after the merger of Hyderabad with India and the Majlis-e-Ittehadul Muslimeen was initially banned—though it was allowed to be rechartered as All India MIM (AIMIM) under new leadership in 1957. Qasim Rizvi was jailed and served in Indian prisons for almost a decade. After his release, he migrated to Pakistan.

See also 
 Muslim National Guard
 Razakars (East Pakistan)
 Hyderabad State Forces

References

Bibliography

Further reading

External links 
 
 Razakars - a "rope around the neck" of the Nizam

Hyderabad State
Military history of the princely states of India
History of Hyderabad, India
Monarchists
Government paramilitary forces
Paramilitary organisations based in India
All India Majlis-e-Ittehadul Muslimeen
Military wings of nationalist parties
Year of establishment missing